Lists of gun cartridges contain articles about gun cartridges of different types. 
Cartridges can be classified by type of firearm, by caliber or by type of primer (e.g. centerfire, rimfire).
See :Category:Cartridge families for more information on different categories of cartridges.
The lists include:

Type of firearm

List of rifle cartridges
List of handgun cartridges
Table of handgun and rifle cartridges

Caliber
List of cartridges by caliber

Statut
List of wildcats cartridge

Other dimensions
List of cartridges by base diameter

Primer
List of rimfire cartridges
List of Winchester Center Fire cartridges

 

de:Liste Handfeuerwaffenmunition